Hormius is a genus of parasitoid wasp in the subfamily Hormiinae first described by Christian Gottfried Daniel Nees von Esenbeck in 1818.

Species 

 Hormius abnormis Belokobylskij, 1995
 Hormius aemulus Belokobylskij, 1989
 Hormius affinis (Hedqvist, 1963)
 Hormius albipes Ashmead, 1895
 Hormius americanus Ashmead, 1890
 Hormius amus Papp, 1990
 Hormius anamariamongeae Sharkey, 2021
 Hormius angelsolisi Sharkey, 2021
 Hormius anniapicadoae Sharkey, 2021
 Hormius antefurcalis Belokobylskij, 1995
 Hormius appositus Belokobylskij, 1995
 Hormius argutus Belokobylskij, 1989
 Hormius arthurchapmani Sharkey, 2021
 Hormius australis Belokobylskij, 1989
 Hormius barryhammeli Sharkey, 2021
 Hormius belliatus Belokobylskij, 1989
 Hormius caboverdensis Hedqvist, 1965
 Hormius capensis Hedqvist, 1963
 Hormius carloswalkeri Sharkey, 2021
 Hormius carmenretanae Sharkey, 2021
 Hormius cesarsuarezi Sharkey, 2021
 Hormius crassivalvus Belokobylskij, 1989
 Hormius danbrooksi Sharkey, 2021
 Hormius decembris Belokobylskij, 1990
 Hormius deletus Wharton, 1993
 Hormius dispar (Brues, 1907)
 Hormius eddysanchezi Sharkey, 2021
 Hormius elegans Szepligeti, 1914
 Hormius elongatus (Hedqvist, 1963)
 Hormius erikframstadi Sharkey, 2021
 Hormius ferrugineus (Hedqvist, 1963)
 Hormius flavicauda Granger, 1949
 Hormius gelechiae Belokobylskij, 2001
 Hormius georgedavisi Sharkey, 2021
 Hormius grettelvegae Sharkey, 2021
 Hormius gustavoinduni Sharkey, 2021
 Hormius hartmanguidoi Sharkey, 2021
 Hormius hectoraritai Sharkey, 2021
 Hormius hesiquiobenitezi Sharkey, 2021
 Hormius hirtus Belokobylskij, 1989
 Hormius ikarus Belokobylskij, 1995
 Hormius intermedius (Hedqvist, 1963)
 Hormius irenecanasae Sharkey, 2021
 Hormius isidrochaconi Sharkey, 2021
 Hormius jaygallegosi Sharkey, 2021
 Hormius jimbeachi Sharkey, 2021
 Hormius jimlewisi Sharkey, 2021
 Hormius joelcracrafti Sharkey, 2021
 Hormius johanvalerioi Sharkey, 2021
 Hormius johnburleyi Sharkey, 2021
 Hormius joncoddingtoni Sharkey, 2021
 Hormius jorgecarvajali Sharkey, 2021
 Hormius juanmatai Sharkey, 2021
 Hormius keralicus Narendran, 1999
 Hormius lamidae Papp, 1990
 Hormius longipilosus Belokobylskij, 1989
 Hormius longistigmus Belokobylskij, 1989
 Hormius longiventris Belokobylskij, 1988
 Hormius macroculatus Belokobylskij, 1989
 Hormius maderae Graham, 1986
 Hormius manuelzumbadoi Sharkey, 2021
 Hormius melleus (Ashmead, 1889)
 Hormius mercedesfosterae Sharkey, 2021
 Hormius minialatus Tobias, 1977
 Hormius modonnellyae Sharkey, 2021
 Hormius moniliatus (Nees, 1811)
 Hormius montanus Belokobylskij, 1995
 Hormius nelsonzamorai Sharkey, 2021
 Hormius notus Belokobylskij, 1995
 Hormius oreas Graham, 1986
 Hormius orientalis Belokobylskij, 1980
 Hormius pacificus (Ashmead, 1905)
 Hormius pallidus Belokobylskij, 1990
 Hormius pamelacastilloae Sharkey, 2021
 Hormius paraphrasis Belokobylskij, 1995
 Hormius propodealis (Belokobylskij, 1989)
 Hormius radialis Telenga, 1941
 Hormius raycypessi Sharkey, 2021
 Hormius ritacolwellae Sharkey, 2021
 Hormius robcolwelli Sharkey, 2021
 Hormius rogerblancosegurai Sharkey, 2021
 Hormius romani (Hedqvist, 1963)
 Hormius ronaldzunigai Sharkey, 2021
 Hormius rugosicollis Ashmead, 1895
 Hormius rugosus (Hedqvist, 1963)
 Hormius russchapmani Sharkey, 2021
 Hormius sculpturatus Tobias, 1967
 Hormius similis Szepligeti, 1896
 Hormius solocipes (Enderlein, 1912)
 Hormius submersus (Brues, 1933)
 Hormius tenuicornis Graham, 1986
 Hormius teutoniae (Hedqvist, 1963)
 Hormius tsugae Mason, 1968
 Hormius virginiaferrisae Sharkey, 2021
 Hormius vitabilis Papp, 1990
 Hormius vulgaris Ashmead, 1893
 Hormius warrenbrighami Sharkey, 2021
 Hormius willsflowersi Sharkey, 2021

References

 

Braconidae genera